Kujak Mahmudi (also Romanized as Kūjaḵ Maḥmūdi) is a village in Jakdan Rural District, in the Central District of Bashagard County, Hormozgan Province, Iran. At the 2006 census, its population was 15, in 4 families.

References 

Populated places in Bashagard County